James Fanshawe is a British racehorse trainer.

Horse training career
He principally trains flat horses such as multiple Group 1 winner Soviet Song.  However, he has twice won the Champion Hurdle: in 1992 with Royal Gait, previously a disqualified winner of the Ascot Gold Cup; and ten years later with Hors La Loi III.

Fanshawe has also won at the Cheltenham and Aintree festivals with the J. P. McManus-owned Reveillez.

He trains at Pegasus Stables in Newmarket.

Major wins

 Great Britain
 British Champions Fillies' and Mares' Stakes – (1) – Seal of Approval (2013)
 British Champions Sprint Stakes – (1) – The Tin Man (2016)
 Champion Hurdle – (2) – Royal Gait (1992), Hors La Loi III (2002)
 Diamond Jubilee Stakes – (1) – The Tin Man (2017)
 Eclipse Stakes – (1) – Environment Friend (1991)
 Falmouth Stakes – (3) – Macadamia (2003), Soviet Song (2004, 2005)
 Fillies' Mile – (1) – Soviet Song (2002)
 Golden Jubilee Stakes – (1) – Society Rock (2011)
 Haydock Sprint Cup – (2) – Society Rock (2012), The Tin Man (2018)
 July Cup – (1) – Frizzante (2004)
 Sussex Stakes – (1) – Soviet Song (2004)

 France
 Prix de l'Opéra – (1) – Speedy Boarding (2016)
 Prix du Cadran – (2) – Invermark (1998), High Jinx (2014)
 Prix Jean Romanet – (3) – Ribbons (2014), Speedy Boarding (2016), Audarya (2020)

 Ireland
 Irish St. Leger – (1) – Arctic Owl (2000)
 Matron Stakes – (1) – Soviet Song (2004)

 Canada
 E. P. Taylor Stakes – (1) – Wandering Star (1996)

 United States
 Breeders' Cup Filly & Mare Turf – (1) – Audarya (2020)

References

External links
James Fanshawe official website

Living people
British racehorse trainers
Year of birth missing (living people)